Federal elections were held in Germany on 2 December 1990 to elect the members of the 12th Bundestag. This was the first all-German election since the Nazi show election in April 1938, the first multi-party all-German election since that of March 1933, which was held after the Nazi seizure of power and was subject to widespread suppression, and the first free and fair all-German election since November 1932. The result was a comprehensive victory for the governing coalition of the Christian Democratic Union/Christian Social Union and the Free Democratic Party (FDP), which was reelected to a third term. The second vote result of the CDU/CSU, 20,358,096 votes, remains the highest ever total vote count in a democratic German election.

The elections marked the first since 1957 that a party other than CDU/CSU and the Social Democratic Party (SPD) won a constituency seat, and the first (and only) time since 1957 that FDP won a constituency seat (Halle).

Campaign

This was the first election conducted after German reunification which took place on 3 October. Previously, the  had selected 144 of its members which were then co-opted as Members of the German Bundestag and served until the end of the 11th Bundestag.

Almost 150 seats had been added to represent the re-established eastern states of Germany, without reducing the number of western members. The euphoria following the reunification gave the ruling CDU/CSU–FDP coalition a dramatic advantage in both Western and Eastern Germany throughout the campaign.

It was the one election for which the 5% threshold was applied not nationwide but separately for the former East Germany (including East Berlin) and former West Germany (including West Berlin). As a result, while the Western Greens did not gain representation, their ideologically-similar Eastern Alliance 90 did, with both merging to form Alliance 90/The Greens in 1993. The combined vote of the two lists totals over 5%, but as the two lists would not merge until 1993, it thus did not entitle the East German party to any elected members from the former West Germany, unlike the PDS, who managed to elect Ulla Jelpke in North Rhine-Westphalia.

The German Social Union (DSU) under leader Hansjoachim Walther, a right-wing party modeled after the Bavarian CSU running only in former East Germany, failed to achieve the separate 5% threshold, only receiving around 1% of the vote in the eastern states, mostly in the southeast. As part of the co-option, the DSU had previously had eight Members of the Bundestag, who sat as guests in the CDU/CSU caucus. The CSU, which had heavily supported the DSU financially, severed its ties in 1993 and the party fell into irrelevancy. After a law allowing a linkage of the lists of the CSU and DSU was overturned by the Federal Constitutional Court, the CSU tried to convince the CDU to stand down in several single-member constituencies to enable the DSU to enter the Bundestag separate from the 5% threshold, but Kohl adamantly refused.

Results
All change figures are relative to the pre-existing West German Bundestag.

Results by state
Second vote (Zweitstimme, or votes for party list)

Constituency seats

List seats

Post-election 
The governing CDU/CSU-FDP coalition was returned to office with a landslide majority, and  remained chancellor. The CDU did exceptionally well in the former East Germany, which had been the heartland of the SPD before the Nazi era.

Notes

References

Sources
 The Federal Returning Officer
 Psephos

Federal elections in Germany
1990 elections in Germany
Helmut Kohl
December 1990 events in Europe